The Aquaculture Advisory Committee (AAC) was established by the Government of South Australia to support the development of the aquaculture sector in the state- the birthplace of Southern bluefin tuna ranching. Its role was to provide relevant advice to the Minister regarding the administration of the Aquaculture Act 2001, related policies, proposals, regulations and any amendments to them. In 2012, Fisheries Minister Gail Gago described the AAC as playing "a vital role in informing and advising Government to ensure the ecological sustainable development of South Australia’s world-leading aquaculture." In September 2014 it was recommended that the council be abolished in favour of direct sectoral representation.

Membership
Members were appointed to the Aquaculture Advisory Committee for a period of three years, following a nomination process. As of 2012, members were entitled to sitting fees of $206 per 4 hour session. The Committee typically mets four to five times a year and meetings were held at 25 Grenfell St, Adelaide. The Committee included a combination of Members and Deputy Members who together represent the industry, its regulators and local government.

At 30 June 2014, membership included:

Previous members included (but were not limited to): 
 Prof. Gail Anderson
 Prof. Anthony Cheshire
 Steven Clarke
 Andrew Christian
 Debra Davey 
 Andrew James Ferguson
 David Hitchcock
 Julianne Marshall
 Steven Mawer
 Heather Montgomerie
 Mary Mitchell
 Ian Nightingale
 Frederick 'Fred' Pedler
 Emmanuelle Sloan
 Jeffrey Todd
 Grant Westphalen
 Wolfgang Zeidler
 Bruce Zippell

References 

Advisory boards of the Government of South Australia
Economic history of South Australia
Aquaculture in Australia